Maurice Godin is a Canadian actor, who has appeared in several films and television shows.

Career
Born in Toronto, Ontario, Canada, Godin has been acting in theatre, television and film for over thirty years. He received four years of classical conservatory training at Ryerson Theatre School in Toronto (at what is now Toronto Metropolitan University) after which he completed an apprenticeship at the Shaw Festival in Canada. He continued his actor training with international teachers and coaches at the Stratford Shakespearean Festival. His theatre career has taken him from coast to coast across Canada where he has appeared in the major theaters of almost every province, including the Shaw Festival and the Stratford Shakespearean Festival, where he garnered critical acclaim for his portrayal of Arturo Ui in Bertolt Brecht's The Resistible Rise of Arturo Ui. Some of his numerous theatre credits include Mercutio in Romeo and Juliet, d'Artagnan in The Three Musketeers, Constantin in The Seagull, Puck in A Midsummer Night's Dream and Rochester in Jane Eyre.

Godin has also performed extensively in musical theatre most notably in the roles of the Emcee in Cabaret, the Master in Godspell, Joey Evans in Pal Joey, Herschel Blackwell in Fire and in an award-winning performance of Screamin' John in John Gray's Rock and Roll. He also portrayed Edmund in King Lear, starring Christopher Plummer. He was a cast member of the Broadway show, The Farnsworth Invention, written by Aaron Sorkin and directed by Des MacNuff.

Among his many television credits, Godin has guest-starred on Still Standing, The Practice, Ally McBeal, Friends, The Outer Limits and Seinfeld. He has also played recurring characters on Poltergeist: The Legacy, 3rd Rock from the Sun, First Monday and Spin City. He has been a series regular on Café Americain’’, Life with Roger, and Working. His feature film work includes such Canadian films as White Room, Salt Water Moose, and Double Take. He played the flamboyant role of Hector in the film Boat Trip (2003), followed by guest roles on Medical Investigation, House, Las Vegas as well as a comic turn as Wesley the bumbling burglar in the film Chestnut (Hero of Central Park). He has also portrayed the French composer Georges Bizet in Bizet's Dream.

He also guest starred in Disney Channel shows Wizards of Waverly Place as Ronald Longcape Sr. and Good Luck Charlie'' as Mr. Walsh.

Godin is working on a novel inspired by a childhood raised in an Acadian household.

Godin is currently on faculty at California State University, Northridge, where he teaches performance technique and opera scene study in the opera division of the music department. He is also the director of the annual spring or fall operas.

References

External links
 
 

Living people
Acadian people
Male actors from Toronto
Canadian expatriate male actors in the United States
Canadian male film actors
Canadian male musical theatre actors
Canadian male stage actors
Canadian male television actors
Canadian male voice actors
Toronto Metropolitan University alumni
Year of birth missing (living people)